Ndjili may refer to:

 Ndjili, Kinshasa, also known as N'djili or N'Djili, a commune of Kinshasa in the Democratic Republic of the Congo
 Ndjili River, a river that runs through Kinshasa
 Institut de N'Djili, a secondary school in Kinshasa
 N'djili Airport, also known as Kinshasa International Airport